Tawfique Nawaz is a Bangladeshi lawyer and director of Transparency International Bangladesh. He is married to Dipu Moni, the Minister of Education and former Minister of Foreign Affairs. He is a senior advocate of the Bangladesh Supreme Court.

Career 
Nawaz published The New International Economic Order in 1980 with the University of Michigan. He was a research associate to Kamal Hossain while studying at the Wadham College, Oxford. From 1979 to 1981, he served as a director of Bangladesh Institute of Law and International Affairs.

In 1993, Nawaz was an honorary director of Bangladesh Institute of Law and International Affairs. He was the Coordinator of Human Rights Project of Bangladesh Institute of Law and International Affairs.

Nawaz sued BRAC Bank Limited claiming BRAC as a NGO could not own a bank; the suit was dismissed by the Bangladesh Supreme Court in 2001. His co-council in the case was Advocate Mohsen Rashid.

In 2007, Nawaz, along with Barrister Sheikh Fazle Noor Taposh, represented Prime Minister Sheikh Hasina after she was arrested by the Fakhruddin Ahmed led Caretaker Government during the 2006–2008 Bangladeshi political crisis. He pointed that Hasina's was being deprived of her right to a telephone under the jail code.

In 2010, Nawaz accompanies Dipu Moni to an official visit to Tripura, India. Nawaz represented the Bangladesh Bank and the Government of Bangladesh in court case that sought to remove Yunus from the bank he founded, Grameen Bank, in 2011. He appeared as friend of the court in the 2011 case against staff of Bangladesh Biman on contempt charges after they refused to upgrade the economy seat of Justice Shamsuddin Chowdhury Manik to business class. He was critical of the report, "Biman's flight delayed for altercation on plane", by The Daily Star which he claimed had damaged the judiciary.

Nawaz led the Bangladesh Government claim against Niko Resources seeking compensation for the Tengratila Gas Field explosion. In 2013 Niko tried unsuccessfully to get the case dismissed through the International Centre for Settlement of Investment Disputes. He sought 106 million dollar is damages from Niko on behalf of Petrobangla.

In 2014, Nawaz represented Dhaka Education Board and Inter-Education Board Coordination Committee under the Ministry of Education in a lawsuit by a student asking for a recheck of her exam papers. In April 2014, he and his fellow lawyer SM Munir, were summoned by the High Court who found their comments in a reply to the student as contemptuous of the court. The court asked them why it should pursue contempt charges against them.

Nawaz wrote the entry for Alaap, a traditional form of music in Bangladesh, in Banglapedia, the national encyclopedia of Bangladesh. He is a trustee board member of Transparency International Bangladesh. According to Zafar Sobhan, the editor of Dhaka Tribune, Nawaz is responsible for driving a wedge between Prime Minister Sheikh Hasina and Nobel Laurate Professor Muhammad Yunus. Sobhan described as "a pettifogging journeyman advocate of little distinction" who had failed the bar multiple times trying to becoming a barrister.

Nawaz is an executive committee member of Shiropa Development Society.

Personal life 
Nawaz is married to Dipu Moni, Minister of Education. He and his son, Tawquir Rashaad Nawaz, performed Alaap on Raga Adbhut Durga at a celebration of the 100th birth anniversary of Pannalal Ghosh and held at the Bangladesh National Museum.

Nawaz's brother, Taimor Nawaz, is a doctor. Taimor treated Nawaz after he suffered a stroke on 17 July 2019. In August 2019, Prime Minister Sheikh Hasina visited Nawaz at United Hospital. Madinatul Ulum Hafezia Madrasa in Gulistan organized special prayers for his recovery.

Nawaz's family is from Midnapore in West Bengal and he still has many relatives there. Xulhaz Mannan, is the cousin of Dipu Muni.

References 

Living people
Year of birth missing (living people)
Bangladeshi lawyers
People from Midnapore
Alumni of Wadham College, Oxford